Cleopatra is a feminine given name. It was the name of various characters in Greek Mythology and was frequently used among Royal dynasties in the Hellenistic period.
It may refer to:

People

Ancient world

Queens of Ancient Egypt
 Cleopatra I Syra (c. 204–176 BC), princess of the Seleucid Empire by birth, and queen of Egypt by marriage
 Cleopatra II of Egypt (c. 185–116 BC), queen (and briefly sole ruler) of Egypt
 Cleopatra III of Egypt (169–101 BC), queen of Egypt
 Cleopatra IV of Egypt (c. 138–135 BC), queen of Egypt
 Berenice III of Egypt (120-80 BC), queen of Egypt, also known as Cleopatra and Cleopatra Berenice
 Cleopatra V of Egypt (died c. 69/68 BC or c. 57 BC), queen of Egypt
 Cleopatra VI of Egypt (died c. 57 BC), queen of Egypt (possibly Cleopatra V)
 Cleopatra VII Philopator, also known as simply Cleopatra (69–30 BC), last active ruler of the Ptolemaic Kingdom of Egypt

Other
 Cleopatra Eurydice of Macedon (4th century BC), wife of Philip II of Macedon
 Cleopatra of Macedon (c. 356–308 BC), queen of Epirus, sister of Alexander the Great, daughter of Philip II of Macedon and Olympias of Epirus
 Cleopatra Thea (c. 164–121 BC), daughter of Cleopatra II and Ptolemy VI Philometor
 Cleopatra Selene of Syria (c. 135–130 BC), daughter of Cleopatra III and Ptolemy VIII Physcon
 Cleopatra of Pontus (110–after 58 BC), wife of Tigranes the Great
 Cleopatra of Jerusalem (1st century BC), wife of Herod the Great
 Cleopatra Selene II (40–5 BC), daughter of Cleopatra VII and Mark Antony
 Cleopatra the Physician (1st century AD), Greek physician and author
 Saint Cleopatra (3rd and 4th century AD, d. 319 or 327), Christian saint
 Cleopatra the Alchemist (3rd or 4th century AD), Greek alchemist, author and philosopher

Modern world
 Cleopatra, Hereditary Princess of Oettingen-Spielberg (born 1987), German-Chilean actress, model, and aristocrat
 Cleopatra Birrenbach  Persian-American fashion designer and entrepreneur
 Cleopatra Borel (born 1979), female shot putter from Trinidad and Tobago
 Cleopatra Coleman (born 1987), Australian actress
 Cleo Demetriou (born 2001), Cyprus-born actress
 Cleopatra Higgins (born 1982), British singer
 Cleopatra Koheirwe (born 1982), Ugandan actress, writer, singer and personality
 Cleopatra Mathis (born 1947), American poet and professor
 Cleopatra Pantazi (born 1963), Greek singer
 Cleopatra Stratan (born 2002), Moldovan singer
 Cleopatra Tawo (d. 2017), a radio personality from Nigeria
 Cleopatra Tucker (born 1943), American politician

Fictional characters
 the protagonist of the blaxploitation films Cleopatra Jones (1973) and Cleopatra Jones and the Casino of Gold (1975)
 Cleopatra Wong, the protagonist of three films: They Call Her Cleopatra Wong (1978), Dynamite Johnson (1979) and Devil's Angels (1980)
 Cleopatra (Rome character), in the historical drama series Rome
 Cleopatra, in the animated sitcom Clone High
 Cleopatra, the protagonist of the television series Cleopatra 2525, which aired from 2000 to 2001
 Cleopatra Funnie, in the animated television series Doug
 Cleopatra Corns, the protagonist of the manga series Cleopatra DC
 Cleopatra, important poet and lawmaker in the future world of Robert Graves' Seven Days in New Crete

Feminine given names